Rowan Coultas (born 21 June 1997) is a British snowboarder. He competed in the 2018 Winter Olympics but failed to make the finals in the slopestyle discipline by only half a point and came 18th.

What started with a Christmas present of a snowboard lesson in 2009 has now become a profession for Rowan Coultas, culminating in him becoming an Olympian.

A fan of skating and surfing when away from the snow, Coultas made his World Cup debut in February 2015 at the Park City slopestyle – finishing 13th.

With a silver Junior World Championship medal to his name from 2010 and numerous World Cup top-ten finishes, Coultas was selected to make his Olympic debut at PyeongChang 2018.

He competed in both the men's slopestyle and big air in South Korea, finishing 18th in his heat in the former and eighth in his heat in the latter. The big air performance saw him miss out on qualification for the final by just half a point.

References

1997 births
Living people
Snowboarders at the 2018 Winter Olympics
British male snowboarders
Olympic snowboarders of Great Britain
21st-century British people

2. https://www.teamgb.com/athlete/rowan-coultas/5Rt68NRiJPSdRrLSZesI42